The Bedford Creek, a perennial stream of the Hawkesbury-Nepean catchment, is located in the Blue Mountains region of New South Wales, Australia.

Course
The river descends  over its  course.

The river is entirely contained within the world heritage-listed Blue Mountains National Park.

See also

 List of rivers of Australia
 List of rivers of New South Wales (A–K)
 Rivers of New South Wales

References

Rivers of New South Wales
Rivers of the Blue Mountains (New South Wales)